The Indiana Harbor and Ship Canal is an artificial waterway on the southwest shore of Lake Michigan, in East Chicago, Indiana, which connects the Grand Calumet River to Lake Michigan.

The canal also functions as a harbor (Indiana Harbor). The outer harbor is sheltered by two bulkheads marked by lights including the Indiana Harbor East Breakwater Light. Ships enter the outer harbor from the north.  The inner harbor consists of the canal itself.  The entrance to the outer harbor lies near Indiana Shoals, which extend up to 5 miles offshore, where water depths are as shallow as 15 feet.

In 2002, Indiana Harbor was the 45th busiest harbor in the United States, handling almost 13,300,000 short tons (12,000,000 metric tons) of cargo. Foreign trade accounted for only 500,000 short tons (450,000 metric tons) of that. Indiana Harbor is maintained by the Chicago District of the U.S. Army Corps of Engineers, as authorized by the Rivers and Harbors Act of 1913.

History
The canal and harbor were built over several years beginning in 1901. For its part, Inland Steel agreed to construct a steel mill there that would cost no less than one million dollars. The shortline railway connecting this area to other rail lines is still known as the Indiana Harbor Belt Railroad.

Marktown, Clayton Mark's planned worker community, is located at Indiana Harbor.

Economy

Manufacturing
Indiana Harbor and Canal lies in a heavily industrial area which includes Cleveland-Cliffs two Indiana Harbor Works facilities. On the west side of the canal is the former Youngstown - J & L - LTV Steel -  ISG steel mill. On the east side of the canal is the other Indiana Harbor Works, once known as Inland Steel Company, then Ispat Inland. BP's refinery in Whiting is nearby.

The harbor allows transport of iron ore (taconite pellets) and limestone to the steel mills from the mines and quarries of the upper Midwest through the Great Lakes. Other commodities include coke, gypsum, steel, cement and concrete, petroleum products, and miscellaneous bulk products.

The harbor is ranked first in tonnage among the 25 federal commercial harbors on Lake Michigan, and second in tonnage of the 55 Federal commercial harbors on the Great Lakes.

Environmental issues

Ninety percent of the water which passes through the Canal originates as industrial outflow or stormwater overflow. Historic contamination by polychlorinated biphenyls (PCBs), polycyclic aromatic hydrocarbons (PAHs) and heavy metals has put the canal under the EPA's Grand Calumet River Area of Concern (AoC)—the only AoC to be listed impaired in all 14 beneficial use categories. Because of this sediment contamination, no dredging has taken place in the harbor since 1972, when the USEPA determined the previous sediment disposal method of open water disposal in Lake Michigan to be unacceptable. Shipping capacity has been reduced by 15%, increasing shipping costs.

The Chicago District of the U.S. Army Corps of Engineers, in partnership with the East Chicago Waterway Management District, initiated plans for a dredging and disposal project for sediment at the harbor in the 1990s. The nearby site of a former Energy Cooperative, Inc. (ECI) refinery, which is also an open USEPA Resource Conservation and Recovery Act (RCRA) site, was selected as the location for a confined disposal facility (CDF) to safely contain the contaminated sediment.  Despite some local environmental justice concerns over the close proximity of the CDF to two low-income public schools, construction of the facility began in spring 2002.  Dredging activities were set to begin upon completion of the CDF, and planned to be carried out over a period of 10 years to finally return the harbor to its authorized dredge depths, with an additional 20 years of maintenance dredging to remove future accumulated sediments. The total cost of the project was originally estimated at $180 million.  Dredging did not, however, commence until 2012, fully forty years after the canal was last dredged. Phase 1 dredging was completed in November 2020. Construction of Phase 2 began in July 2021 and is expected to continue until November 2023.

See also
Calumet River – Grand Calumet River Area of Concern

Further reading
 Perry, W.A. (1979) A History of Inland Steel Company And The Indiana Harbor Works (booklet)

References

External links
Indiana Harbor, U.S. Army Corps of Engineers
Images of the Indiana Harbor steel mills
Indiana Harbor and Canal Dredging and Disposal Project
Confined Disposal Facility and Federal Navigation Project
Dredging Project
Harbor light

East Chicago, Indiana
Canals in Indiana
Ports and harbors of Indiana
Transportation buildings and structures in Lake County, Indiana